David Stitchkin Branover was a Chilean attorney and rector of the University of Concepción from 1956 to 1962.

Background and education
He was born in Santiago, Chile, on October 25 1912.  He attended the Law School of the University of Chile.

Career
At age 27, Branover became a professor at the Law School of the University of Chile.

In 1956 he was named rector of the University of Concepción in Concepción, Chile.

He is remembered for his role in founding the university's Casa del Arte museum during his tenure as Rector.

Personal life
Branover married Fanny Litvak and the couple had four children, Sergio, Eliana, Lilian and Claudio.

Branover died on July 12, 1997.

References

Chilean scholars and academics